Bangomunda a tehsil located at about 95 km from Balangir  in Titlagarh sub-division of Bolangir district, Odisha, India, has historical importance. Bangomunda is the new name of Banganmura which means Brinjal Firm.

Places of interest
Ranipur-Jharial, a tourist place in Odisha, is just  from Bangomunda, is also known as Somatirtha. Durga Mandir, situated in the bank of the village's pond, is a historical place, and a famous temple in this locality.

Festivals
The people of Bangomunda celebrate most of the festivals of Odisha like Rath Yatra Durga Puja, Diwali, Kumar Purnima or Gaja Laxmi Puja, Manabasa Gurubar, Sabitri Brata, Makar Sankranti, Bishuba/Pana Sankranti, Dola Purnima or Holi, Gamha Purnima or Rakshya Bandhan, Kartik Purnima, Nabanna or Nuakhai, Pua jiuntia, Bhai jiuntia, Janmastami, Ram Navami, Saraswati Puja, and Ganesh Puja. The primary festival, however, is Nuakhai.

Some festivals are unique to the place, like Chatar jatra, Kansa Badha, Dhanu Yatra, Navratri Durgapuja. Bhai jiuntia is celebrated during this time on Astami Tithi. In "Bhai jiuntia" sisters pray for their brothers' long life and tie a thread called "Jiuntia". Nuakhai is also an important festival which is celebrated on Panchami tithi of Bhadraba sukla pakshya.

Demographics
As per 2011 Census of India, Bangomunda had a population of 5,759, consisting of 2,802 males and 2,957 females. Schedule Castes constituted 1318 people and Schedule Tribes constituted 481 people. The literacy rate was 60.27% .

Education
There are government schools in town for primary as well as secondary education. C.M. High School is for class 8th to 10th. Saraswati Shishu Mandir and Akhil Bharatiya English Medium School are private schools. Panchayat Samiti College is for college education, but is limited to arts stream only.

Many of the students are studying outside the state for higher education and a few have studied abroad as well .

Beside educational institutes there are also centers for computer learning and industrial training.

Public transport
The town is in the center point of three commercial hubs of Odisha. Public transportation is limited here as only a bus facility is available. The nearest airport is in Raipur.

References

External links
 Bolangir website

Cities and towns in Bolangir district
Tehsils of India